This article lists events that occurred during 1987 in Estonia.

Incumbents

Events
Singing demonstrations against Soviet occupation was begun.
23 August – about 2,000 demonstrators commemorated the anniversary of Molotov–Ribbentrop Pact.
Estonian History Museum was inaugurated.

Births
17 May – Ott Lepland, singer

Deaths

See also
 1987 in Estonian television

References

 
1980s in Estonia
Estonia
Estonia
Years of the 20th century in Estonia